Kunur may refer to:
 Kunur River, a river in West Bengal, India
 Kunnur, a village in Karnataka
 Koonur, a village in Telangana
 Coonoor, a town in Tamil Nadu